Ho Song-taek (1908 –  1958?) was a Korean labor activist, an independence activist, and a politician in the early years of the Democratic People's Republic of Korea.

Biography
Born and raised in Seongjin, Hambuk (nowadays Kimchaek), North Hamgyong Province, he led the anti-Japanese movement in solidarity with the unions that existed in Joseon during the Japanese occupation in 1927. At that time, Heo Kuk-taek, Heo Sung-taek, and Heo Young-shik were used as pseudonyms. In the early 1930s, he realized that it was difficult to engage in labor and independence movements without socialism and economic knowledge in Joseon. After returning to the Korean Peninsula in 1935, he joined the labor union and committed to an active strike and anti-Japanese movement toward Japan, and in 1936, he was serving as a prisoner in the Sungjin Farmers Union and served in prison for three years. Since 1940, he has participated in the reconstruction movement of the Communist Party of Korea and, after liberation, organized the National Council of the Korean Workers' Union, a labor movement group affiliated with the Namro Party.
 
In 1934, he graduated from the Communist University of the Toilers of the East. After returning to Korea following its liberation in August 1945, the organization of farmers and trade unions August 1948 Central member of the Korean Workers' Party.

In September 1946, he initiated the “September General Strike” of the National Council of Korea Trade Unions, which was the largest strike during the Joseon Dynasty. However, the anti-communist youth group and the U.S. military police force failed to crack down on him, and he remained silent for a year before being caught and served for a year in prison.

In September 1948, following the formal declaration on the Democratic People's Republic of Korea, he was elected to the Supreme People's Assembly and was appointed to the first Labor Minister in the North Korean Cabinet led by Premier of North Korea Kim Il-sung. In 1954, he became Minister of Transport and, in September 1957, Minister of Coal Industry. In 1958, he was purged and executed.

References

Workers' Party of Korea politicians
Korean communists
1908 births
1958 deaths
Government ministers of North Korea
Members of the 1st Supreme People's Assembly
Members of the 2nd Supreme People's Assembly
People from Kimchaek
20th-century politicians
Labor ministers
Transport ministers